Iris Higbie Wilson Engstrand (born January 9, 1935) is a retired American academic. She was professor of history at University of San Diego from 1968 until 2017; she joined the faculty of the San Diego College for Men before it and other colleges joined to form the university in 1972.

She specialized in the history of California and Spanish exploration during the 1700s, and as of 2017 had written about twenty books on those subjects.

She serves on the board of directors of the Maritime Museum of San Diego.  She served as co-editor of the Journal of San Diego History since 2004, served as the president of the Western History Association from 2004 to 2005, and in 2007 was awarded the Order of Isabella the Catholic by the government of Spain for her contributions to the field of Spanish history.

She was born in 1935 in Los Angeles and earned her B.A. (1956), M.A. (1957), and Ph.D. (1962) from the University of Southern California. Her dissertation topic was "Scientific Aspects of Spanish Exploration in New Spain during the Late Eighteenth Century," and was supervised by Donald C. Cutter. She began her teaching career in the Huntington Beach High School from 1957 to 1959, and then worked as a translator of Spanish manuscripts for the Los Angeles County Museum, 1959-60. She became a lecturer at the University of Southern California in 1962, and an instructor at Long Beach City College in 1962.

Selected works

Engstrand, Iris H. W., & Bullard, Anne. (1999). Inspired by nature: The San Diego Natural History Museum After 125 years. San Diego Natural History Museum.

References

Living people
1935 births
Recipients of the Order of Isabella the Catholic
American women historians
University of Southern California alumni
University of San Diego faculty
Writers from Los Angeles
Historians from California
21st-century American women